Rhinophis dorsimaculatus, commonly known as the polka-dot earth snake, is a species of snake in the Uropeltidae family. It is endemic to the scrub jungles of Sri Lanka.

References

Further reading
 Deraniyagala, P.E.P. 1941. A new fossorial snake (Rhinophis dorsimaculatus) from Ceylon. J. Bombay Nat. Hist. Soc. 42 (4): 800–802.

dorsimaculatus
Snakes of Asia
Reptiles of Sri Lanka
Endemic fauna of Sri Lanka
Reptiles described in 1941
Taxa named by Paulus Edward Pieris Deraniyagala